The Seattle Center Totem is a 1970 totem pole carved by Duane Pasco, Victor Mowatt, and Earl Muldon, installed at Seattle Center in the U.S. state of Washington. The 30-foot-tall totem depicts a hawk, a bear holding a salmon, a raven, and a killer whale. The work was funded by the Seattle Arts Commission.

References

External links
 
 Seattle Center Totem at Waymarking

1970 establishments in Washington (state)
1970 sculptures
Fish in art
Sculptures of bears
Sculptures of birds in the United States
Seattle Center
Totem poles in the United States
Whales in art